Leticia Teleguario is a Kaqchikel politician and Indigenous rights activist. She served as Guatemala's Minister of Labor and Social Welfare between 14 January 2016 until 18 September 2018 under the government of Jimmy Morales.

References

Living people
Women government ministers of Guatemala
Year of birth missing (living people)
Maya people
21st-century Guatemalan women politicians
21st-century Guatemalan politicians